Edward D. Maryon (April 5, 1931 - March 9, 2005) was an American painter and educator. He taught art at his alma mater, the University of Utah, from 1957 to 1991, and he was the dean of its College of Fine Arts from 1964 to 1981. He painted watercolors. According to Utah Art, Utah Artists: 150 Year Survey, "His paintings are representational but contemporary in that the colors are modified and intensified, as is the light and shade, and space is used in an arbitrary way. The subject matter is stylized freely to enhance the abstract quality of the work."

Further reading

References

1931 births
2005 deaths
Artists from Salt Lake City
University of Utah alumni
University of Utah faculty
American watercolorists
American male painters
Painters from Utah
20th-century American painters
21st-century American painters
21st-century American male artists
20th-century American male artists